John Joseph McCarthy (born 1953) is an American linguist and the Provost and Senior Vice Chancellor for Academic Affairs at the University of Massachusetts Amherst since July 2017. In July 2018, he assumed office as the Provost.

McCarthy is best-known for his work on Optimality Theory in phonology: with Alan Prince, he devised Correspondence Theory and alignment constraints, although he has subsequently renounced the latter. He has since written textbooks like Doing Optimality Theory: Applying Theory to Data. Earlier in his career, McCarthy was responsible, along with Prince, for extending autosegmental phonology, and later Optimality Theory, to morphology, in particular to solve the problem of nonconcatenative morphology in Semitic languages.

Career
HHe completed his A.B. in linguistics and Near Eastern languages at Harvard College and obtained his Ph.D. from MIT in 1979. He was a professor at the University of Texas at Austin and a visiting scientist at Bell Labs before moving to the University of Massachusetts Amherst.

Books
 Formal Problems in Semitic Phonology and Morphology, Routledge 2018
Doing Optimality Theory: Applying Theory to Data, Wiley-Blackwell 2008
 Optimality Theory in Phonology: A Reader (ed.), ‎ Wiley-Blackwell 2008
 A Thematic Guide to Optimality Theory, Cambridge University Press 2001

See also
Nonconcatenative morphology

References

External links
John McCarthy's homepage

1953 births
Harvard College alumni
MIT School of Humanities, Arts, and Social Sciences alumni
Linguists from the United States
American phonologists
University of Massachusetts Amherst faculty
Living people
People from Medford, Massachusetts
Fellows of the American Academy of Arts and Sciences
Fellows of the Linguistic Society of America